A cultural center or cultural centre is an organization, building or complex that promotes culture and arts. Cultural centers can be neighborhood community arts organizations, private facilities, government-sponsored, or activist-run.

Asia
 Central Cultural Center (CCC), Bangladesh 
 Bahman Cultural Center, Tehran, Iran
 Bangkok Art and Culture Centre, Bangkok, Thailand
 Beigang Cultural Center, Yunlin, Taiwan
 Bentara Budaya Jakarta, Jakarta, Indonesia
 Bentara Budaya Yogyakarta, Yogyakarta, Indonesia
 Cultural Center of the Philippines, Philippines
 Hong Kong Cultural Centre, Hong Kong, China
 Japanese Cultural Center, Taipei, Taiwan
 Kaohsiung Cultural Center, Kaohsiung, Taiwan
 Keelung Cultural Center, Keelung, Taiwan
 Ketagalan Culture Center, Taipei, Taiwan
 King Abdulaziz Center for World Culture, Dhahran, Saudi Arabia
 Kohima Capital Cultural Center, Kohima, Nagaland
 Korean Cultural Center, Seoul, Korea
 Sheikh Abdullah Al-Salem Cultural Centre, Kuwait City, Kuwait
 Jaber Al-Ahmad Cultural Center, Kuwait City, Kuwait
 Lukang Culture Center, Changhua County, Taiwan
 Mongolian and Tibetan Cultural Center, Taipei, Taiwan
 Singapore Chinese Cultural Centre (SCCC), Singapore
 Taichung City Dadun Cultural Center, Taichung, Taiwan
 Taichung Municipal City Huludun Cultural Center, Taichung, Taiwan
 Tainan Municipal Cultural Center, Tainan, Taiwan
 Taiwan Cultural Center, Tokyo, Japan
 Telugu Saamskruthika Niketanam, Visakhapatnam, India
 Cultural Center by Talenmark Developers, Calicut, India
 Jaffna Cultural Centre, Sri Lanka
 Thailand Cultural Centre, Bangkoentrance to the Belém Cultural Centre in Bangkok, Thailand
 Tokyo Korean Culture Center, Tokyo, Japan
 Xinying Cultural Center, Tainan, Taiwan

Europe

Vooruit, Ghent, Belgium
National Palace of Culture, Sofia, Bulgaria
Kulturværftet, Helsingør, Denmark
Tullikamari Cultural Centre, Tampere, Finland
Centre Georges Pompidou, Paris, France
Gasteig, Munich, Germany
Letterkenny Regional Cultural Centre, County Donegal, Ireland
European Cultural Centre, Venice, Italy
Nida Culture and Tourism Information Centre "Agila", Neringa, Lithuania
 Public institution Cultural center "Nikola Djurkovic", Kotor, Montenegro
ACU, Utrecht, Netherlands
De Balie, Amsterdam, Netherlands
Glaspaleis, Heerlen, Netherlands
OT301, Amsterdam, Netherlands
Centro Cultural de Belem, Lisbon, Portugal
Kuryokhin Center, Saint Petersburg, Russia
Cultural center Bor, Bor, Serbia
Dom omladine Beograda, Belgrade, Serbia
Matadero Madrid, Madrid, Spain

North America

El Centro Cultural de Mexico, Mexico
Polyforum Cultural Siqueiros, Mexico City, Mexico
Eyedrum, Atlanta, United States
Centro Cultural de la Raza, San Diego, California, United States
Detroit Cultural Center, MI, United States
Cultural Center of Charlotte County, Port Charlotte, Florida, United States
Self Help Graphics & Art, Los Angeles, United States
Tia Chucha's Centro Cultural, Los Angeles, California, United States
La Peña Cultural Center, Berkeley, California, United States
Chicago Cultural Center, Chicago, IL, United States
Kansas City Irish Center, Kansas City, Missouri, United States
Asheville Culture Project, Asheville, North Carolina, United States
Greensboro Cultural Center, Greensboro, North Carolina, United States
Polynesian Cultural Center, Hawaii, United States
Howland Cultural Center, Beacon, United States
El Museo del Barrio, New York, New York, United States
The Kitchen, New York, New York, United States
ISSUE Project Room, New York, New York, United States
Park Performing Arts Center, Union City, New Jersey, United States
William V. Musto Cultural Center, Union City, New Jersey, United States
Centro Cultural Baudilio Vega Berríos, Mayagüez, Puerto Rico
The Largo Cultural Center, Largo, Florida, United States
Ugly Mermaid Venue & Cultural Centre, Eau-Claire, Wisconsin, United States

Oceania

 Ngarachamayong Culture Center, Koror, Palau
 Perth Cultural Centre, Perth, Australia
 Queensland Cultural Centre, Brisbane, Australia
 Vanuatu Cultural Centre, Port Vila, Vanuatu

South America
Agustín Ross Cultural Center, Pichilemu, Chile
Nestor Kirchner Cultural Centre, Ciudad de Buenos Aires, Argentina 
Centro Cultural Recoleta, Ciudad de Buenos Aires Argentina
Centro Cultural Banco do Brasil, Brasília, Belo Horizonte, Rio de Janeiro, São Paulo
Centro Cultural São Paulo, São Paulo, Brazil
Centro Cultural Palacio de La Moneda, Santiago, Chile
Centro Cultural Gabriela Mistral, Santiago, Chile
Ema Gordon Klabin Cultural Foundation, São Paulo, Brazil
Narguila Pub Lounge Cultural, Bogotá. Colombia
Centro Cultural Banco do Brasil, Rio de Janeiro, Brasilia, and São Paulo. Brazil.

See also
 Community centre
 Infoshop
 Music venue

References